Manouchka Kelly Labouba (Arabic: مانوشكا كيلي لابوبا), is a Gabonese filmmaker and screenwriter primarily direct short films. She has made several critically acclaimed short films including Marty et la tendre dame, Le guichet automatique and Le divorce. Apart from direction, she is also an academic, cinematographer, editor and camera operator.

Academic career
In 2005, she studied Film & Media Studies at University of California, Santa Barbara. Then, in 2007, he obtained Master de Recherche, Arts from Bordeaux Montaigne University. Later he graduated with a M.A. Critical Studies and then Ph.D. Cinema and Media Studies from University of Southern California to obtain and also graduated with a Certificate in the Business of Entertainment.

Cinema career
In 2004, she made the short Bouchées d'Amours. It was officially selected at the 2004 Chartres National Student Film Festival. In 2008, she made her debut cinema production Le divorce, which was critically acclaimed at several international film festivals. This 40 minute short was included in official selection at the 2008 Carthage Film Festival, official selection at the 2009 Panafrican Film and Television Festival of Ouagadougou (FESPACO), official selection at the 2009 Ecrans Noirs Festival, official selection at the 2010 Ouagadougou African Women Film Festival. It was also selected out of competition at the 2010 Abidjan International Short Film Festival (FFAA) and 2012 World Music & Independent Film Festival. She also won the award for the Best Directorial Debut at 2009 Eacrans Noirs Festival.

In 2010, she directed four short films: Bébé Portable, Combien Ca Coute?, Enfant De Ta Mére, and Le Menteur & Le Voleur where the later included in official selection at the 2010 Ecrans Noirs Festival. She also worked as the first assistant director in three shorts: La Particuliére, Les Bonnes Maniéres, and La Guerre des Ordures. In 2011 she directed the short Le guichet automatique which was included in official selection at the 2011 Ecrans Noirs Festival.

Apart from direction, she worked as the writer for many short films including: From D.W.G. to D.W.Jr: The Black ManÕs Burden (2006) and Michel Ndaot: Entre Ombres et Lumiéres (2008).

Filmography

References

External links
 
 Interview de Manouchka Kelly Labouba 1
 Interview de Manouchka Kelly Labouba 2
 Manouchka Kelly Labouba publications

Gabonese film directors
Living people
Year of birth missing (living people)
Documentary film directors
University of California, Santa Barbara alumni
Bordeaux Montaigne University alumni
University of Southern California alumni
21st-century Gabonese people